Məlikçobanlı or Melik-Chobany or Melikchobanly may refer to:
 Məlikçobanlı, Agsu
 Məlikçobanlı, Shamakhi